Arthur Stokes may refer to:
 Arthur Stokes (footballer)
 Arthur Stokes (cyclist)
 Art Stokes, American baseball player